Rubens Márcio Cordeiro Galaxe (born 29 April 1952) is a Brazilian former football player and manager who played as a midfielder. He competed in the men's tournament at the 1972 Summer Olympics.

References

External links
 

1952 births
Living people
Footballers from Rio de Janeiro (city)
Brazilian footballers
Association football midfielders
Brazil international footballers
Olympic footballers of Brazil
Footballers at the 1972 Summer Olympics
Millonarios F.C. players
Fluminense FC players
São Cristóvão de Futebol e Regatas players
Goytacaz Futebol Clube players
Brazilian football managers
Fluminense FC managers
Clube do Remo managers